Freshbrook is a suburb in the west of Swindon, England, close to junction 16 of the M4 motorway. Most houses in the area are found in culs-de-sac, except for those on the few main roads. The suburb is served by the shops of a small "village centre" and has a primary school.

Adjacent areas are Grange Park to the north and west, Toothill to the east, Blagrove industrial estate to the south, and Windmill Hill business park to the west. A large housing development, Wichelstowe, was built southeast of Freshbrook, from 2009; it is separated from Freshbrook by Great Western Way and the main railway line.

History 

Freshbrook was built during the early 1980s as part of the 'West Swindon' urban extension of Swindon.

Transport 

Main roads are Gainsborough Way, Worsley Road, Rowton Heath Way, and Liskeard Way.

Freshbrook is served by Stagecoach West bus service 10 which goes in two directions around Freshbrook: one way to the nearby Link Centre at West Swindon, and the other direction towards Toothill, town centre, Gorse Hill and Kingsdown. Since November 2016, it runs every 10 minutes Monday to Saturday daytime and every 30 minutes Sundays. Since April 2017, there has been a reduced evening service, with the last 10 bus leaving the town centre at 10:20pm. Prior to this date there was a secondary route, service 55A, which diverted from the main 55 route to Chippenham to serve Freshbrook in the evenings and on Sundays.

Prior to service 10, Freshbrook's buses were 8: to Link Centre, town centre, Great Western Hospital and Chiseldon and 9/9A/9B: to Link Centre, town centre, Wroughton and Thorney Park. Together these routes provided the 10 minute frequency (each was every 20 minutes). This was a popular service and as a result, punctuality became poor, resulting in a need to change the service.

From early 2007 until 2010, a 54 service also ran through Freshbrook from Wootton Bassett through the town centre and on to Wroughton, every 20 minutes.

Freshbrook is also served by Swindon's Bus Company operating a service for schoolchildren to travel to Ridgeway School in Wroughton. This is the No.154 which makes one journey in each direction on school days.

Education 
Freshbrook has one school, Millbrook Primary School, which had 329 pupils in July 2022. From 1988 a second primary school, Windmill Hill, was housed in a prefabricated building; as the local birth rate fell, in 2008 the building was closed and the school was merged with the school previously called Freshbrook School to form Millbrook. The Windmill Hill school building was destroyed by fire in 2011 in a suspected arson. A Church of England primary school, Oliver Tomkins, is nearby in Toothill.

For secondary education, pupils from Freshbrook can attend Lydiard Park Academy (which is in nearby Grange Park), Bradon Forest School at Purton, or the Ridgeway School and Sixth Form College at Wroughton.

Leisure and recreation 
The West Swindon district centre in Westlea is just north-east of Freshbrook. On the site are the Link Centre which has a swimming pool, national-size ice rink, other sports facilities and a library; also an Asda supermarket and other retail outlets.

Representatives 
Freshbrook, along with Grange Park and part of Toothill, elects three councillors for the Lydiard and Freshbrook ward of Swindon Borough Council, a unitary authority. Freshbrook forms part of the parliamentary constituency of South Swindon.

At the 2011 census, the population of the electoral ward (then called Freshbrook and Grange Park, with slightly different boundaries) was 9,889.

References

Swindon